The West Ocala Historic District  is a historic district in Ocala, Florida. On June 27, 2002, it was added to the U.S. National Register of Historic Places.

References

External links
 National Register of Historic Places listings for Marion County

Ocala, Florida
National Register of Historic Places in Marion County, Florida
Historic districts on the National Register of Historic Places in Florida
2002 establishments in Florida